Sir Max Pemberton  (19 June 1863 – 22 February 1950) was a popular English novelist, working mainly in the adventure and mystery genres.

Life
He was educated at St Albans School, Merchant Taylors' School, and Caius College, Cambridge. A clubman, journalist and dandy (Lord Northcliffe admired his 'fancy vests'), he frequented both Fleet Street and The Savage Club.

Pemberton was the editor of boys' magazine Chums in 1892–1893 during its heyday.  Between 1896 and 1906 he also edited Cassell's Magazine (see ), in which capacity he published the early works of R. Austin Freeman and William Le Queux.His most famous work The Iron Pirate was a best-seller during the early 1890s and it launched his prolific writing career (see below). It was the story of a great gas-driven iron-clad, which could outpace the navies of the world and terrorised the Atlantic Ocean. Other notable works included Captain Black (1911). Pemberton's 1894 collection Jewel Mysteries: From a Dealer's Note Book was a series of Mystery stories revolving around stolen jewels. Pemberton also wrote historical fiction. Pemberton's I Crown Thee King is set in Sherwood Forest during the time of Mary I. His novels Beatrice of Venice (1904) and Paulina (1922) centre on Napoleon's military campaigns in Italy.

During January 1908, Pemberton had a story entitled Wheels of Anarchy published by Cassell & Company (London). This story was based upon notes that were written by his friend Bertram Fletcher Robinson shortly before he died in January 1907. It is an adventure tale about anarchists and assassins that is set across Europe. The novel's hero and narrator, Bruce Driscoll, a recent Cambridge graduate, appears to be modelled upon Fletcher Robinson.Pemberton was member of a criminology literary society known as 'Our Society' along with eleven other notable members including Bertram Fletcher Robinson and Arthur Conan Doyle.

In 1920, Pemberton founded the London School of Journalism, wrote a biography about Alfred Harmsworth, 1st Viscount Northcliffe. He was married to Alice Tussaud, granddaughter of Madame Marie Tussaud and daughter of Joseph Tussaud.

Pemberton also wrote a biography of Sir Henry Royce published in 1934 shortly after Royce's death.

Honours
Pemberton was knighted in the 1928 Birthday Honours, gazetted on 1 June 1928.

Selected works

The Iron Pirate (1893)

The Sea Wolves (1894) 
Jewel Mysteries I have Known. From a Dealer's Note Book (1894)
The Impregnable City (1895)
The Little Huguenot: A Romance of Fountainebleau (1895)
A Gentleman's Gentleman (1896)]
Christine of the Hills (1897)
The Phantom Army (1898)
A Woman of Kronstadt (1898)
The Signors of the Night: The Story of Fra Giovanni (1899)
Féo (1900)
The Footsteps of a Throne... (1901)
The Giant's Gate: A Story of a Great Adventure (1901)
Pro Patriâ (1901)
I Crown Thee King (1902)
The Garden of Swords (1902)
The House Under the Sea (1902)
A Puritan's Wife (1902)
Doctor Xavier (1903)
The Gold Wolf (1903)
Beatrice of Venice (1904)
A Daughter of the States (1904)
Red Morn (1904)
Mid the Thick Arrows (1905)
The Lady Evelyn (1906)
My Sword for Lafayette (1906)
Aladdin of London or, Lodestar (1907)
The Amateur Motorist (1907)
The Diamond Ship (1907)
Love, the Harvester: A Story of the Shires (1908)
Sir Richard Escombe (1908)
Wheels of Anarchy, the Story of an Assassin (1908)
The Adventures of Captain Jack (1909)
The Mystery of the Green Heart (1910)
The Show Girl (1910)
White Walls (1910)
Captain Black: A Romance of the Nameless Ship (1911)
White Motley (1911)
The Hundred days (1912)
Swords Reluctant (1912)
Two Women (1914)
"The Donnington Affair" (The Premier, November 1914; a Father Brown story written with G. K. Chesterton)

Sources
New General Catalog of Old Books and Authors

References

The Rivals of Sherlock Holmes: Early Detective Stories, ed. Hugh Greene (Penguin, 1971)

External links 

 
 
 
 
Three plays by Max Pemberton on Great War Theatre

1863 births
1950 deaths
19th-century British novelists
20th-century British novelists
People educated at Merchant Taylors' School, Northwood
People educated at St Albans School, Hertfordshire
Alumni of Gonville and Caius College, Cambridge
Knights Bachelor
London School of Journalism
British male novelists
19th-century English male writers
20th-century English male writers
English mystery writers
English historical novelists
Writers of historical fiction set in the early modern period
Burials at St Mary's Catholic Cemetery, Kensal Green